Will Ellis Renfro (March 15, 1932 in Batesville, Mississippi – September 18, 2010 in Pensacola, Florida) was an American football offensive tackle in the National Football League for the Washington Redskins, the Pittsburgh Steelers, and the Philadelphia Eagles.  He played college football at the University of Memphis and was drafted in the 24th round of the 1954 NFL Draft.

External links
Obit

1932 births
2010 deaths
American football offensive tackles
Memphis Tigers football players
People from Batesville, Mississippi
Players of American football from Mississippi
Philadelphia Eagles players
Pittsburgh Steelers players
Washington Redskins players